George Forster may refer to:
 Johann George Adam Forster (1754–1794), German scientist and revolutionary who travelled around the world with James Cook
 George Forster (traveller) (died 1792), English traveller and civil servant of the East India Company
 Sir George Forster, 2nd Baronet (1796–1876), Irish politician
 George Forster (murderer) (died 1803), Englishman executed for manslaughter
 George J. Forster (1905–1988), mayor of Madison, Wisconsin
 George H. Forster (1838–1888), American lawyer and politician from New York
 George Forster (fl. 1776), a British captain in the Battle of the Cedars

See also
 George Foster (disambiguation)